Monica Yvonne Forsberg (born 14 September 1950) is a Swedish singer, songwriter and actress.  She was a member in the group Ritz, which competed in Melodifestivalen in 1983 (which finished number 4 with the song "Marionett") and 1985 (with the song "Nu har det hänt igen", which finished unplaced).  

Forsberg was born in Karlskoga. Following her Melodifestivalen appearance, from the late 1980s until the early 2000s, she dubbed Disney movies and cartoons, including DuckTales.

Awards
As a lyrics writer, she won Melodifestivalen twice, with these songs:
1982: "Dag efter dag" with Chips
1983: "Främling" with Carola Häggkvist

Other songs she has competed with in Melodifestivalen as lyrics writer:
1983: "Marionett" with Ritz, 4th
1984: "Nu är jag tillbaks igen" with Janne Önnerud, unplaced, "Schack och matt" with Rosa Körberg, unplaced
1985: "Eld och lågor" with Göran Folkestad, 3rd, "Nu har det hänt igen" with Ritz, unplaced
1986: "Fem i tolv" with Fredrik Willstrand, unplaced
1988: "100%" with Lotta Engberg & Triple & Touch, 3rd, "Bang, en explosion" with Haakon Pedersen, 4th, "Kärlek är" with Sten Nilsson & Nilssonettes, unplaced
1996: "Juliette & Jonathan" with Lotta Engberg, 3rd

References 

1950 births
Living people
Swedish composers
Swedish women singers
Swedish voice actresses
Melodifestivalen contestants of 1985